Kvačany is a village and municipality in Prešov District in the Prešov Region of eastern Slovakia.

History
In historical records the village was first mentioned in 1626.

Geography

References

External links
 

Villages and municipalities in Prešov District
Šariš